The 2001–02 Lithuanian Hockey League season was the 11th season of the Lithuanian Hockey League, the top level of ice hockey in Lithuania. Six teams participated in the league, and Garsu Pasaulis Vilnius won the championship. SC Energija received a bye until the finals, as they played in the Eastern European Hockey League.

Regular season

Playoffs

Quarterfinals
 Galve Trakai - Ledo Arena Kaunas 8:5/3:3 OT
 Garsu Pasaulis Vilnius - Jauniai Elektrenal 19:2/12:2

Semifinal 
 Galve Trakai - Garsu Pasaulis Vilnius 0:5 Forfeit/0:5 Forfeit

Final 
 Garsu Pasaulis Vilnius - SC Energija 7:6 SO

External links
Season on hockeyarchives.info

Lithuanian Hockey League
Lithuania Hockey League seasons
Lith